The Milbank Baronetcy, of Well in the County of York, and of Hart in the County of Durham, is a title in the Baronetage of the United Kingdom. It was created on 16 May 1882 for Frederick Milbank, member of parliament for the North Riding of Yorkshire and for Richmond.

The second Baronet represented Radnorshire in the House of Commons as a Conservative. The fourth Baronet was Master of the Household between 1954 and 1967. The fifth Baronet focused on estate management and won awards for game conservancy.

Barningham Park country house and estate has been home to the Milbank family since 1690.

Milbank baronets, of Well and Hart (1882)
Sir Frederick Acclom Milbank, 1st Baronet (1820–1898)
Sir Powlett Charles John Milbank, 2nd Baronet (1852–1918)
Sir Frederick Richard Powlett Milbank, 3rd Baronet (1881–1964)
Sir Mark Vane Milbank, 4th Baronet (1907–1984)
Sir Anthony Frederick Milbank, 5th Baronet (1939–2016)
Sir Edward Mark Somerset Milbank, 6th Baronet (born 1973)

The heir apparent is the present holder's son Harry Frederick Somerset Milbank (born 2009).

See also
Milbanke baronets

Notes

References
Kidd, Charles, Williamson, David (editors). Debrett's Peerage and Baronetage (1990 edition). New York: St Martin's Press, 1990, 

Milbank